Jeffrey Lee Stout (born September 11, 1950) is an American religious studies scholar who is Professor Emeritus of Religion at Princeton University. He is a member of the Department of Religion, and is associated with the departments of Philosophy and Politics, the Center for the Study of Religion, and the Center for Human Values.  His works focus on the possibility of ethical discourse in a religiously pluralistic society. He served as president of the American Academy of Religion in 2007.

Life and career 
Stout was born on September 11, 1950, in Trenton, New Jersey. He graduated from Brown University in 1972. Since obtaining his Doctor of Philosophy degree in 1976 from Princeton University, Stout has remained there as Professor of Religion. He is former chair of the Committee for Film Studies at Princeton. He was also president of the American Academy of Religion in 2007.

His two best-known books, for both of which he won the American Academy of Religion Award for Excellence, are Ethics After Babel (1989) and Democracy and Tradition (2003). His most recent book, Blessed Are the Organized: Grassroots Democracy in America (2010), takes an ethnographic turn, investigating the engaged democratic practices that he has endorsed in his previous work.

He has received Princeton University’s Graduate Mentoring Award (2009) and the President’s Award for Distinguished Teaching (2010). He plans to retire in July 2018.

He has also delivered Gifford Lectures in May 2017, with the title "Religion Unbound: Ideals and Powers from Cicero to King", and plans to expand the materials into a book.

Theory 
He has championed what he calls "the moral tradition of democracy" as a "background of agreement" shared by participants in the political/social debates taking place in America today.  This is his answer to such thinkers as Alasdair MacIntyre and Stanley Hauerwas who believe that participants in such debates do not share enough common ground to prevent their arguments from being intractable.  Stout has been influenced by Richard Rorty and more recently Robert Brandom and, albeit with qualifications, aligns himself with the school of philosophy known as American pragmatism.

References

External links
An Interview with Jeffrey Stout Part I and Part II
Stout's personal website
Stout's CV

1950 births
21st-century American non-fiction writers
21st-century atheists
American atheists
American male non-fiction writers
American religion academics
Brown University alumni
Living people
Pragmatists
Princeton University alumni
Princeton University faculty
21st-century American male writers